was a feudal domain under the Tokugawa shogunate of Edo period Japan, located in Tango Province in what is now the northern portion of modern-day Kyoto Prefecture. It was centered around Tanabe Castle, also known as Maizuru Castle which was located in what is now the city of Maizuru, Kyoto. The area of Tango-Tanabe Domain covered the entire area of Kasa County, and corresponds to the current area of the city of Maizuru, and parts of Yura, Miyazu, and Fukuchiyama.

History
From the Muromachi period, Tango Province had been under the control of the Isshiki clan. However, in the Sengoku period, Toyotomi Hideyoshi placed the province under the control of Hosokawa Tadaoki. Following the Following the Battle of Sekigahara, Tokugawa Ieyasu awarded the entire province of Tango to Kyōgoku Takatomo, who established Miyazu Domain. To ensure the succession of his line, Kyōgoku Takatomo gave 35,000 koku of his holdings to his third son, Kyōgoku Takamitsu, and established a cadet branch of the clan at Tango-Tanabe Domain, and 10,000 koku to his grandson, Kyōgoku Takamichi, who established Mineyama Domain. This proved to be a wise decision, his grandson  Kyōgoku Takakuni was charged with misconduct and poor governance by the Tokugawa shogunate and reduced to hatamoto  status in 1666.

The third generation Kyōgoku Takamori gave 2000 koku to his younger brother to establish a cadet branch of the clan in 1663, and was transferred to Toyooka Domain in Tajima Province in 1668. The Kyōgoku were replaced by a cadet brach of the Makino clan from Settsu Province,who ruled until the Meiji restoration. During the tumultuous Bakumatsu period, the domain supported the Tokugawa shogunate in the First Chōshū expedition, but at the start of the Boshin War was ordered to remain at Maizuru to guard the Sea of Japan coast. At the time of the Battle of Toba-Fushimi, the domain switched sides to the imperial cause. Tango-Tanabe Domain became "Maizuru Domain" in 1869 and Maizuru Prefecture in 1871 with the abolition of the han system. It subsequently became part of Kyoto Prefecture in 1876.  The Makino clan was later ennobled with the kazoku peerage title of shishaku (viscount).

Holdings at the end of the Edo period
Unlike most domains in the han system, which consisted of several discontinuous territories calculated to provide the assigned kokudaka, based on periodic cadastral surveys and projected agricultural yields, Tango-Tanabe Domain was a single unified holding. 

Tango Province 
137 villages in Kasa District

List of daimyō 

{| class=wikitable
! #||Name || Tenure || Courtesy title || Court Rank || kokudaka 
|-
|colspan=6|  Kyōgoku clan, 1600-1668 (Tozama)
|-
||1||||1600 - 1636||Shuri-no-daifu (修理大夫)|| Junior 5th Rank, Lower Grade (従五位下)||35,000 koku
|-
||2||||1636 - 1663||Hida-no-kami (飛騨守)|| Junior 5th Rank, Lower Grade (従五位下)||35,000 koku
|-
||3||||1663 - 1668||Ise-no-kami (伊勢守)|| Junior 5th Rank, Lower Grade (従五位下)||35,000->33,000 koku
|-
|colspan=6|  Makino clan, 1668-1871 (Fudai)
|-
||1||||1668 - 1671||Sado-no-kami(佐渡守); Jijū (侍従)|| Junior 4th Rank, Lower Grade (従四位下)||35,000 koku
|-
||2||||1671 - 1693||Inaba-no-kami (因幡守)|| Junior 5th Rank, Lower Grade (従五位下)||35,000 koku
|-
||3||||1693 - 1737||Kawachi-no-kami (河内守)|| Junior 5th Rank, Lower Grade (従五位下)||35,000 koku
|-
||4||||1737 - 1750||Inaba-no-kami (因幡守)|| Junior 5th Rank, Lower Grade (従五位下)||35,000 koku
|-
||5||||1750 - 1783||Buzen-no-kami (豊前守)|| Junior 5th Rank, Lower Grade (従五位下)||35,000 koku
|-
||6||||1783 - 1804||Sado-no-kami (佐渡守)|| Junior 5th Rank, Lower Grade (従五位下)||35,000 koku
|-
||7||||1804 - 1825|| Buzen-no-kami (豊前守)|| Junior 5th Rank, Lower Grade (従五位下)||35,000 koku
|-
||8||||1825 - 1852||Kawachi-no-kami (河内守)||  Junior 5th Rank, Lower Grade (従五位下)||35,000 koku|-
||9||||1852 - 1869|| Kawachi-no-kami  (河内守)|| Junior 5th Rank, Lower Grade (従五位下)||35,000 koku|-
||10||||1869 - 1871||Takumi-no-kami (内匠頭)||  Junior 5th Rank, Lower Grade (従五位下)||35,000 koku
|-
|}

See also 
 List of Han
 Abolition of the han system

Further reading
 Bolitho, Harold. (1974). Treasures Among Men: The Fudai Daimyo in Tokugawa Japan. New Haven: Yale University Press.  ;  OCLC 185685588

References

Domains of Japan
1600 establishments in Japan
States and territories established in 1600
1871 disestablishments in Japan
States and territories disestablished in 1871
Tango Province
History of Kyoto Prefecture